Oxydoras kneri is a species of thorny catfish found in the Paraná River basin in Argentina, Bolivia, Brazil, Paraguay and Uruguay. This species is caught commercially for human consumption. O. kneri is omnivorous, feeding mainly on insects, crustaceans, mollusks, other invertebrates and some vegetable material.

References 
 

Doradidae
Fish of South America
Fish of Argentina
Fish of Bolivia
Fish of Brazil
Fish of Paraguay
Fish of Uruguay
Taxa named by Pieter Bleeker
Fish described in 1862
Taxobox binomials not recognized by IUCN